The 1975–76 All-Ireland Senior Club Hurling Championship was the sixth staging of the All-Ireland Senior Club Hurling Championship, the Gaelic Athletic Association's premier inter-county club hurling tournament. The championship began on 2 November 1975 and ended on 14 March 1976.

St. Finbarr's of Cork were the defending champions, however, they failed to qualify after being beaten by Seandún in the quarter-final of the Cork County Championship.

On 14 March 1976, James Stephens won the championship after 2-10 to 2-04 defeat of Blackrock in the All-Ireland final at Croke Park. This was their first ever championship title.

Results

Connacht Senior Club Hurling Championship

Semi-final

Final

Leinster Senior Club Hurling Championship

First round

Quarter-finals

Semi-finals

Final

Munster Senior Club Hurling Championship

Quarter-finals

Semi-finals

Final

Ulster Senior Club Hurling Championship

Final

All-Ireland Senior Club Hurling Championship

Quarter-final

Semi-finals

Final

Championship statistics

Top scorers

References

1975 in hurling
1976 in hurling
All-Ireland Senior Club Hurling Championship